American Airlines Flight 11 was a domestic passenger flight that was hijacked by five al-Qaeda terrorists on September 11, 2001, as part of the September 11 attacks. The hijackers deliberately crashed the plane into the North Tower of the World Trade Center in New York City, killing everyone aboard the flight and ensuring the deaths of well over a thousand people who were at, above and one floor beneath the impact zone in addition to causing the demise of more than 200 people below the trapped floors, making it by far the deadliest of the four crashes to occur on the day in terms of both plane and ground fatalities. The aircraft involved, a Boeing 767-223ER (registration ) with 92 passengers and crew on-board, was flying American Airlines' daily scheduled morning transcontinental service from Logan International Airport in Boston to Los Angeles International Airport in California.

Fifteen minutes into the flight, the hijackers injured two people, murdered one, and forcibly breached the cockpit while moving the passengers and crew to the rear of the aircraft against their will. The assailants quickly overpowered both the captain and the first officer, allowing hijacker Mohamed Atta to take over the controls, having intensively trained as a pilot in the lead-up to the attacks. Air traffic controllers suspected that the flight was in distress because the crew were no longer responding. They realized the plane had been hijacked when Atta's announcements for the hostages on-board the flight were unintentionally transmitted to air traffic control. In the midst of the hijacking, two flight attendants contacted American Airlines and provided information about the situation as well as casualties suffered by the passengers and crew.

Atta flew the plane into the northern facade of the North Tower at 08:46 local time. Countless people in the streets of New York City and the nearby state of New Jersey witnessed the strike, but few video recordings captured the moment. Documentary filmmaker Jules Naudet captured the only known footage of the initial impact from start to finish. Before the hijacking was confirmed, news agencies began to report on the incident and speculated that the crash had been an accident, an erroneous assumption that was disproven seventeen minutes later when United Airlines Flight 175 was flown into the World Trade Center's South Tower by another group of hijackers.

The crash and subsequent fire caused the North Tower to collapse nearly 102minutes after the impact, resulting in hundreds of additional casualties. During the recovery effort at the World Trade Center site, workers recovered and identified dozens of remains from Flight11 victims, but many body fragments could not be identified.

Flight

The aircraft involved in the hijacking was a Boeing 767-223ER delivered to American Airlines in April 1987, with registration number N334AA. The capacity of the aircraft was 158passengers (9 in first class, 30 in business class and 119 in economy class), but the September11 flight carried 81passengers and 11crew members. This was a light load at 58percent capacity, but higher than the average load factor for Flight11 on Tuesday mornings of 39percent in the months preceding September11. The crew members were Captain John Ogonowski (50), First Officer Thomas McGuinness Jr. (42) (a former Navy fighter pilot), purser Karen Martin and flight attendants Barbara Arestegui, Jeffrey Collman, Sara Low, Kathleen Nicosia, Betty Ong, Jean Roger, Dianne Snyder, and Amy Sweeney.

All 92 people on board were killed, including David Angell (the creator and executive producer of the television sitcom Frasier), his wife Lynn Angell, and actress Berry Berenson, the widow of Anthony Perkins. Family Guy creator Seth MacFarlane had been scheduled to be on the flight but arrived at the airport late. Actor Mark Wahlberg was also scheduled to be on the flight but canceled his ticket the day before as a result of changed plans. Actress Leighanne Littrell, wife of Backstreet Boys singer Brian Littrell, had also previously been booked on the flight but, like Wahlberg, changed her plans at the last minute.

Boarding

Portland, Maine
 Mohamed Atta, the ringleader of the attacks, and a fellow hijacker, Abdulaziz al-Omari, arrived at Portland International Jetport (Portland, Maine) at 05:41 Eastern Daylight Time on September11, 2001. At the Portland ticket counter, Atta asked ticket agent Mike Tuohey for his boarding pass for Flight 11. Tuohey told Atta he would have to check in a second time when he reached Logan. Atta clenched his jaw and appeared on the verge of anger. He told Tuohey that he had been assured he would have "one-step check-in." Tuohey did not budge or rise to Atta's hostility, and simply told him that he would better hurry if he did not want to miss the flight. Although Atta still looked cross, he and Omari left the ticket counter for the Portland airport's security checkpoint.

They boarded Colgan Air Flight5930, which was scheduled to depart at 06:00 and fly to Boston. Both hijackers had first class tickets with a connecting flight to Los Angeles; Atta checked in two bags, while Omari checked in none. When they checked in, the Computer-Assisted Passenger Prescreening System (CAPPS) selected Atta for extra luggage scrutiny, but he boarded without incident.

The flight from Portland departed on time and arrived in Boston at 06:45. Three other hijackers, Waleed al-Shehri, Wail al-Shehri, and Satam al-Suqami, arrived at Logan Airport at 06:45, having left their rental car in the airport parking facility. At 06:52, Marwan al-Shehhi, the hijacker pilot of United Airlines Flight 175, made a call from a pay phone in Logan Airport to Atta's cell phone. This call was apparently to confirm that the attacks were ready to begin.

Boston, Massachusetts
Since they were not given boarding passes for Flight11 in Portland, Atta and Omari checked in and went through security in Boston.  Suqami, Wail al-Shehri, and Waleed al-Shehri also checked in for the flight in Boston. Wail al-Shehri and Suqami each checked one bag; Waleed al-Shehri did not check any bags. CAPPS selected all three for a detailed luggage check. As the CAPPS' screening was only for luggage, the three hijackers did not undergo any extra scrutiny at the passenger security checkpoint.

First Officer Lynn Howland had just arrived in Boston after copiloting the flight from San Francisco that would be redesignated American Flight 11. As she walked off the aircraft and entered the passenger lounge, Atta approached her and asked if she would be flying the plane back across the country. When Howland told him she just brought the aircraft in, Atta turned his back and walked away. As he boarded Flight 11, Atta asked a gate agent whether the two bags he had checked earlier in Portland had been loaded onto the plane. In the rushed check-in after the flight from Portland, airline officials did not load Atta's bags on Flight11.

By 07:40, all five hijackers were aboard the flight, scheduled to depart at 07:45. Atta sat in business class seat 8D with al-Omari in 8G and Suqami in 10B. Waleed and Wail al-Shehri sat in first class seats 2B and 2A. Shortly before takeoff, American Airlines flight service manager Michael Woodward walked aboard for a final check. He briefly passed Atta, making note of this passenger's brooding expression, and then left the plane. At 07:46, one minute behind schedule, the aircraft received clearance to push back from Gate B32, and was cleared to taxi to the runway at 07:50. The aircraft began its takeoff run from Logan International Airport at 07:59 from runway4R.

Hijacking

The 9/11 Commission estimated that the hijacking began at 08:14 when the pilots stopped responding to requests from the Boston Air Route Traffic Control Center (Boston ARTCC). At 08:13:47 Boston ARTCC told the pilots to ascend to a cruising altitude of  but received no response.

At 8:17:59, flight controllers at Boston Center heard a brief, unknown sound on the radio frequency used by Flight 11 and other nearby flights. They did not know where it came from, and they could not be certain, but it possibly sounded like a scream. Boston ARTCC made multiple attempts to talk to Flight11 without reply, and at 08:21, someone in the cockpit stopped transmitting the flight’s Mode-C transponder signal. At 8:23 and 8:25, several times, Aircraft Communication Addressing and Reporting System (ACARS) tried to contact the flight. One ACARS message read, "Good morning, ATC looking for you on 135.32", the other read, "Please contact Boston Center ASAP. They have lost radio contact and your transponder signal." Flight 11 did not reply.

Reports from flight attendants 
According to flight attendants Amy Sweeney and Betty Ong, who contacted American Airlines during the hijacking, the hijackers had stabbed flight attendants Karen Martin and Barbara Arestegui and slashed the throat of passenger Daniel Lewin. The hijackers might have used a predetermined signal: when the pilots turned off the Fasten Seatbelt signs. It is unknown how the hijackers gained access to the cockpit; FAA rules at the time required that the doors remain closed and locked during flight. Ong said she thought that the hijackers had "jammed their way" in.

The commission suggested they attacked the flight attendants to get a cockpit key, to force one of them to open the cockpit door, or to lure the captain or first officer out of the cockpit. It is believed that one or more of the hijackers, possibly the brothers Wail and Waleed al-Shehri, made the first move, attacking Martin and Arestegui. Sweeney said that Martin was badly injured and being given oxygen. Sweeney and Ong said Arestegui's injuries were not as serious. Ong said she heard loud arguing after the hijackers entered the cockpit. It is believed that the hijackers either killed or incapacitated Ogonowski and McGuinness. Sweeney said that one of the hijackers had shown her a device with red and yellow wires that appeared to be a bomb. Ong and Sweeney said that the coach passengers did not seem to fully understand the peril, and were under the impression that there was a routine medical emergency in the front section of the plane, and that the other flight attendants were helping passengers and finding medical supplies. Ong said Lewin appeared to be dead. Sweeney said that Suqami was the one who had attacked Lewin. Lewin was seated in 9B, and Suqami sat directly behind him in 10B.

One assumption is that Suqami attacked Lewin, unprovoked, to frighten other passengers and crew into compliance. Alternatively, Lewin, an American-Israeli Internet entrepreneur who understood Arabic, and had served as an officer in the elite Sayeret Matkal special operations unit of the Israel Defense Forces,  may have attempted to stop the hijacking, and confronted one of the hijackers in front of him, unaware Suqami was behind him. Lewin is believed to be the first fatality in the 9/11 attacks. During a four-minute call to the American Airlines operations center, Ong provided information about lack of communication with the cockpit, lack of access to the cockpit, and that she thought someone had sprayed Mace in the business class cabin. She also provided the seat locations of the hijackers, which later helped investigators to determine their identities.

Hijacker's transmissions 

At 08:24:38, a hijacker’s voice, believed to be Atta, broadcast to Boston ARTCC. Air traffic controllers heard Atta announce, "We have some planes. Just stay quiet and you'll be O.K. We are returning to the airport." At 08:24:56 he announced, "Nobody move. Everything will be okay. If you try to make any moves, you'll endanger yourself and the airplane. Just stay quiet."

As Atta spoke English fluently, he likely made the transmissions. It is also possible that Atta's seatmate, al-Omari, accompanied him into the cockpit. Apparently, Atta tried to make an announcement to the passengers, but keyed the wrong switch and instead his voice was picked up and recorded by air traffic controllers. After Atta’s transmissions and the inability to contact the airliner, air traffic controllers at Boston ARTCC realized that Flight 11 was being hijacked. At 08:26, the plane turned south. At 08:32, the Federal Aviation Administration (FAA) Command Center in Herndon, Virginia, notified FAA headquarters.

At 08:33:59, Atta announced a third and final transmission: "Nobody move, please. We are going back to the airport. Don't try to make any stupid moves." At 08:37:08, the pilots of United Airlines Flight175 verified Flight11's location and heading to flight control. Seconds before their plane was also hijacked, at 8:42 a.m., the pilots of Flight 175 informed New York Center that they previously heard a suspicious announcement over the radio as they were climbing out of Logan 28 minutes earlier, which would have been around the same time Flight 11 was hijacked. This particular transmission was never picked up by controllers on the ground unlike the other three, but the pilots reported hearing the words, "Everyone, stay in your seats."

Fighter jets dispatched 
Boston ARTCC bypassed standard protocols and directly contacted the North American Aerospace Defense Command (NORAD) Northeast Air Defense Sector (NEADS) in Rome, New York. NEADS called on two F-15 fighter jets at Otis Air National Guard Base in Mashpee, Massachusetts, to intercept. Officials at Otis spent a few minutes getting authorization for the fighters to take off. Atta completed the final turn towards Manhattan at 08:43. The order to dispatch the fighters at Otis was given at 08:46, and the F-15s took off at 08:53, roughly seven minutes after American Airlines Flight11 had already crashed into the North Tower. Of the four hijacked aircraft on 9/11, the nine minutes of advance notification about the hijacking of Flight11 was the most time that NORAD had to respond before the aircraft crashed into its intended target.

Crash

At 08:46:40 Atta intentionally crashed American Airlines Flight11 into the northern façade of the North Tower (Tower1) of the World Trade Center.

Witnesses saw the plane flying at low altitude over Manhattan and thought the aircraft was in distress. Lieutenant William Walsh of the FDNY (who appears in the documentary film 9/11) witnessed the aircraft:

We were under the impressionhe looked like he was going down, but we didn't hear any mechanical difficulty. We couldn't figure out why an American Airlines plane would be so low in downtown Manhattan. We sort of expected him to veer off and go into the Hudson. But he just rose a little bit, his altitude, leveled off, and he was headed straight for the Trade Center. So just before he got to the Trade Center, it seemed as though he gained power. We were just watching this airplane on target for the World Trade Center. All of a sudden, boom! He disappears into the Trade Center.

Hundreds were killed instantly at the moment of impact, including everyone on-board the plane and many more in its path, while numerous others were incinerated in the flash fire created by the ignited jet fuel. The damage caused to the North Tower cut off any means of escape at the impact zone, above it, or directly below it, trapping an estimated 800 people who were not killed in the crash. All stairwells and elevator shafts from floors 93 up to 99 were destroyed. The elevator shafts on floors near the impact zone were also severed as the plane cut through, while debris falling from the impact zone sealed up all three stairwells on Floor 92, preventing anyone on the final floor beneath the point of impact from descending. The highest survivors in the North Tower came from the 91st floor. Anyone above was killed by the fire and smoke or the eventual collapse of the tower. Beginning less than 2 minutes after the impact, more than 200 people fell to their deaths from the trapped floors of the North Tower, most of whom were jumpers who deliberately killed themselves to escape the intolerable heat, fire and smoke. Elevator shafts channeled burning jet fuel through the building, allowing some of it to explode in the Skylobbies on floors 78 and 22, and in the main lobby at the base of the tower. The impact sent a shockwave emanating through both towers, with many survivors from the South Tower reporting that their building shook as Flight 11 crashed into the building opposite, though there were no reports of minor damage done to the South Tower from the first attack. 

The crash was seen by countless people in New York City and the nearby state of New Jersey, but only two happened to be recording when the North Tower was struck. French cameraman Jules Naudet was coincidentally filming a documentary on the FDNY when he caught the only clear footage that exists of the plane flying into the tower, and Pavel Hlava, a Czech immigrant, unknowingly taped the impact from far away while driving. A webcam set up by Wolfgang Staehle at an art exhibit in Brooklyn to take images of Lower Manhattan every four seconds also captured images of Flight11 crashing into the North Tower.

News organizations at first reported an explosion or incident at the World Trade Center. CNN broke into a commercial at 08:49 with the headline "World Trade Center Disaster". Carol Lin, who was the first anchor to break the news of the attacks, said:

Some reporters erroneously claimed that the plane that struck the North Tower was a "small, twin-engine jet" despite the size of the hole in the skyscraper. At 8:55 a.m., Senior Advisor to the President Karl Rove conveyed this misleading information to President George W. Bush as he arrived at Emma E. Booker Elementary School in Sarasota, Florida; the President's surmise was that the crash "must have been caused by pilot error." Shortly after, in an on-air phone call from his office at the CNN New York bureau, CNN vice president of finance Sean Murtagh reported that a large passenger commercial jet had hit the World Trade Center. Within minutes, other television networks began interrupting regular broadcasting with news of the crash.

News reporters and many onlookers did not realize that the crash into the North Tower was deliberate. The idea that Flight 11's impact had been unintentional was a conceivable notion given the height of the skyscraper, and while many people in the South Tower chose to evacuate after seeing what had happened to the North, the consequence of this ambiguity was that it led to the Port Authority making the decision not to initiate a full evacuation of the South Tower immediately following the catastrophic damage done to its twin, operating under the assumption that the attack by Flight 11 was merely an accident. Seventeen minutes after Flight 11 struck the North Tower, in a sight seen by millions on live television, United Airlines Flight 175 was deliberately flown into the South Tower, confirming to the entire world that it was anything but.

Aftermath

After the crash, the North Tower burned for 102minutes before collapsing at 10:28. Although the impact itself caused extensive structural damage, the long-lasting fire ignited by jet fuel was blamed for the structural failure of the tower. In addition to the aircraft passengers and building occupants, hundreds of rescue workers also died when the tower collapsed. Despite being the first of the two buildings to be hit, the North Tower was the second to collapse. Furthermore, it stood for nearly twice as long after being struck as the South Tower, with the latter burning for only 56 minutes before collapsing. This is because Flight 11 crashed into the North Tower at a lower speed and much higher up than Flight 175 did into the South Tower, leading to there being far less structural weight above the impact zone; the North Tower had 11 floors above the point of impact while the South Tower had more than twice that amount. Cantor Fitzgerald L.P., an investment bank on floors 101–105 of the North Tower, lost 658employees, considerably more than any other employer.

Rescue workers at the World Trade Center site began to discover body fragments from Flight11 victims within days of the attack. Some workers found bodies strapped to airplane seats and discovered the remains of a flight attendant with her hands bound, suggesting the hijackers might have used plastic handcuffs. Within a year, medical examiners had identified the remains of 33victims who had been on board Flight11. They identified two other Flight11 victims, including purser Karen Martin, in 2006, while other unrelated body fragments were discovered near Ground Zero around the same time. In April 2007, examiners using newer DNA technology identified another Flight11 victim. The remains of two hijackers, potentially from Flight11, were also identified and removed from Memorial Park in Manhattan. The remains of the other hijackers have not been identified and are buried with other unidentified remains at this park.

Suqami's passport survived the crash and landed in the street below. Soaked in jet fuel, it was picked up by a passerby who gave it to a New York City Police Department (NYPD) detective shortly before the South Tower collapsed. Investigators retrieved Mohamed Atta's luggage, which had not been loaded onto the flight. In it, they found Omari's passport and driver's license, a videocassette for a Boeing 757 flight simulator, a folding knife, and pepper spray. In a recording, a few months later in Afghanistan, Al Qaeda's leader, Osama bin Laden, took responsibility for the attack. The attack on the World Trade Center exceeded even bin Laden's expectations: he had expected only the floors above the plane strikes to collapse. The flight recorders for Flight11 and Flight175 were never found.

After the attacks, the flight number for the scheduled flight on the same route with the same takeoff time is now currently American Airlines Flight2455. These flights now use an Airbus A321 instead of a Boeing 767. An American flag is flown on the jet bridge of gate B32 from which Flight11 departed Logan Airport.

In 2002, the first recipients of the annual Madeline Amy Sweeney Award for Civilian Bravery were Sweeney and Ong. Ogonowski also received a posthumous award. They were all residents of Massachusetts. Relatives of all three accepted the awards on their behalf.

On April 26, 2013, a piece of the wing flap mechanism from a Boeing 767 was discovered wedged between two buildings at Park Place, near where other landing gear parts were found. The onboard defibrillator from Flight11 was found in 2014 during roadwork near Liberty Street.

At the National September 11 Memorial, the names of the 87victims of Flight11 are inscribed on the North Pool, on Panels N-1 and N-2, and Panels N-74N-76.

See also

 American Airlines Flight 77
 United Airlines Flight 93
 United Airlines Flight 175 
 List of aircraft hijackings
 List of tenants in One World Trade Center (1971-2001)

Notes

References

Works cited

External links

 The Final 9/11 Commission Report

 9-11 NTSB Report

 
 , September 11, 2001
 , September 12, 2001

 
2001 fires in the United States
2001 in New York City
2001 in Massachusetts
2001 murders in the United States
Accidents and incidents involving the Boeing 767
Aircraft hijackings in the United States
Airliner accidents and incidents in New York City
Airliner accidents and incidents involving deliberate crashes
Airliner accidents and incidents caused by hijacking
Airliners involved in the September 11 attacks
11
Aviation accidents and incidents in the United States in 2001
Disasters in New York City
Filmed murder–suicides
Islamic terrorism in the United States
Logan International Airport
Mass murder in New York (state)
Mass murder in the United States
Mohamed Atta
Murder–suicides in New York City
Murder in New York City
Mass murder in 2001
Terrorist incidents in the United States in 2001
World Trade Center
Mass murder in New York City